Ishimori (written: 石森 lit. "stone forest") is a Japanese surname. Notable people with the surname include:

, Japanese professional wrestler
, Japanese voice actor

See also
, Japanese manga artist, formerly known as Shotaro Ishimori
Ishimori Productions, a Japanese production company
Ishimori equation, a partial differential equation

Japanese-language surnames